Ingo Glass (b. 1941 – d. 2022) was a sculptor. 
 
Ingo Glass participated with his metal art sculpture in the International Steel Sculpture Workshop and Symposium in 1987.

Ingo Glass's art
 2013 Kassak Museum, Budapest
 2010 Haus der Kunst, Munich, Germany
 2010 Kunsthalle Nürnberg, Germany
 2001 Centre of Polish Sculpture, Orońsko, Poland
 1994 Modern Art Museum Foundation, Hünfeld

References

Links
 bio of Ingo Glass

Living people
1941 births
Romanian sculptors
Artists from Timișoara